Mary Tape (1857–1934) was a desegregation activist who fought for Chinese-Americans' access to education, notably in the case Tape v. Hurley in 1885, in which the Supreme Court of California stated that public schools could not exclude her daughter Mamie Tape for being Chinese-American.

Biography

Early life and immigration to the United States 
She was born in Qing China, near Shanghai, and in 1868 emigrated as an unaccompanied minor to the United States. She found a home in San Francisco at the Ladies Protection and Relief Society, where she learned English and took the name of her caretaker, Mary McGladery. In 1875, she married Chinese-born Joseph Tape, with whom she had four children.

Tape's accomplishments as an amateur photographer and painter attracted the attention of a local reporter, who described his initial disbelief that "a Chinese girl" was capable of these skills.

Desegregation activism
In 1884, Mary Tape's daughter, Mamie, was denied admission at Spring Valley Primary School because of her Chinese heritage. The Tape family filed suit against the school principal and the city's board of education. The suit was recognized by the Superior Court and upheld by the Supreme Court of California in Tape v. Hurley. The school superintendent pushed through legislation to create "separate but equal" Chinese schools and directed the Tapes to a new Chinese Primary School in Chinatown.

While Joseph and Mamie Tape are named in the suit, it was Mary Tape who continued arguing their case in a detailed letter of protest to the Board of Education, which concluded with an argument that prejudice is un-American:
  
I will let the world see Sir What justice there is When it is govern by the Race prejudice men! just because she is of the Chinese decend [...] just because she is descended of Chinese parents I guess she is more of an American then a good many of you that is going to prevent her being Educated.

References

1857 births
1934 deaths
School desegregation pioneers
American people of Chinese descent
Chinese-American culture in California
People from San Francisco
Activists from the San Francisco Bay Area
People from Shanghai
Qing dynasty emigrants to the United States
Women civil rights activists